Avanti Popolo is a 2012 Brazilian drama film directed by Michael Wahrmann. It was selected for the Rotterdam and Rome festivals in 2013, awarded for best film at the  CinemaXXI competition.

The film mixes fiction and documentary, following the story of André Gatti, a researcher who rescues some Super 8 footage shot by his brother in 1970, while in the resistance against the dictatorship, trying to revive the memory of their father, who has been waiting for his missing son for the last 30 years.

Cast
 André Gatti as André, the son
 Carlos Reichenbach as	The Father
 Eduardo Valente as Taxi driver
 Marcos Bertoni as Super 8mm technician
 Paulo Rigazzi	as Neighbour
 Mariah da Penha as Lady in bus station
 Júlio Martí as Missing son
 Michael Wahrmann as Radio presentation
 Estopinha as Baleia, the dog

References

External links
  
 

Brazilian drama films
2012 drama films
2012 films
Films about Brazilian military dictatorship
2010s Portuguese-language films